Kamil Wiktor Stoch (born 25 May 1987) is a Polish ski jumper. He is one of the most successful ski jumpers in the history of the sport, having won two World Cup titles, three Four Hills Tournaments (two of them consecutive), three individual gold medals at the Winter Olympics, individual and team gold at the Ski Jumping World Championships, and individual silver at the Ski Flying World Championships. His other tournament wins include Raw Air (twice), the Willingen Five, and Planica7.

Stoch is among only three ski jumpers in history, alongside Sven Hannawald and Ryoyu Kobayashi, to win the "grand slam" of all four competitions in a single Four Hills Tournament. In 2018, at age 30, Stoch became the oldest individual Olympic gold medallist and World Cup titlist in the history of ski jumping. He was voted Polish Sportspersonality of the Year in 2014 and 2017.

Personal life
Kamil Stoch was born in Zakopane, Poland, to Krystyna and Bronisław Stoch and raised in Ząb near Zakopane. He has two older sisters – Anna (born 1983) and Natalia (born 1985). In 2006 he graduated from the School of Sports Championships in Zakopane. In 2012 he graduated the University School of Physical Education in Krakow with master's degree in physical education (MPhEd). On 7 August 2010 he married Ewa Bilan.

Career
He was three years old when he started skiing for the first time. A year later, he started ski jumping. When he was six years old, he received his first ski-jumping skis from his uncle. He joined the club ŁKS Ząb as an eight-year-old boy, where his first coach was Mirosław Małuda. Initially, he trained in the sport of Nordic combined.

At the 2006 Ski-flying World Championships in Kulm, Stoch finished 9th in the team event and 35th in the individual event. He competed at his first Olympics in 2006, in Turin, Italy. Having qualified for the finals in the normal hill and large Hill, he finished 16th and 26th, respectively. He also qualified for the team competition (large hill), where Poland placed 5th.

Stoch won the Polish Championship in 2007. At the 2007 FIS Nordic World Ski Championships in Sapporo, Stoch finished 5th in the team large hill and 11th in the individual normal hill. He also won a World Cup Summer Grand Prix competition in Oberhof in 2007.

In 2008, Stoch was 6th in the individual world cup in Val di Fiemme. In 2009, he was 4th in individual World Championship in Liberec on the normal hill.

2009/2010
At the 2010 Winter Olympics in Vancouver, British Columbia, Canada, the Polish ski jumping team was led by Adam Małysz (who would win the silver medal in both individual events). Stoch again qualified for the finals in all three events, finishing 27th in the Normal hill and 14th in the Large hill, while the Polish team placed sixth in the team competition. Stoch won a 2010 Summer World Cup competition in Wisła and 2011 World Cup events in Zakopane (rescheduled from Harrachov), Klingenthal, and Planica.

2010/2011
On 23 January 2011 on Wielka Krokiew in Zakopane, Poland – he won a World Cup competition for the first time in his career. It was the first time on the podium in this series. He was the fourth Polish ski jumper after Stanisław Bobak, Piotr Fijas and Adam Małysz, who won a World Cup competition.

A week later, the team competition, held annually in Willingen with jumps devoted to distance 139 m and 130 m, contributed to gaining third place for the Polish team. On 2 February 2011, he won second World Cup competition in Klingenthal, Germany. On 22 February 2011, he won the third title of Polish Champion in Szczyrk, where he jumped twice at 101.5 m. During World Cup in Lahti, Finland, he gains third place with the team again. The season 2010/2011 ended in Planica, Slovenia, where third time in the history of Polish ski jumping – two ski jumpers were on the podium together. On 20 March 2011, Stoch won third in his career World Cup competition, and Adam Małysz was third. A day earlier, during a trial run before the competition team, Stoch set his new personal record and landed at 226 m. The Polish national team was ranked third place in the Nations Cup. Kamil Stoch ended the season in 10th place in the general individual classification.

2011/2012
On 26 December 2011, Wisła Malinka, Poland, held Polish Championship. In the first series, Stoch jumped 123.5 m. In the second, he jumped 136 meters, which set a new record object, and won the gold medal.

On 20 January 2012 was held the first of two World Cup competitions in Zakopane. After the jump on a distance of 125.5 m in the first series held the second position. On the other hand, he jumped 135 m, the longest distance in the competition. The second series gave Stoch a fourth career victory, the second in Zakopane.

In the first competition in Predazzo, after the landings at 123.5 mi 126 m, peaked at 7th place, with a loss of 4.2 points to the podium. In both series, jumped in adverse wind conditions. The next day of the competition on Trampolino dal Ben jumped a distance of 125,5 mi 131.5 m, which gave him the victory before Gregor Schlierenzauer and Anders Bardal. This allowed him to stay ahead in the overall standings Thomas Morgenstern and move up to fourth place.

Season 2011/2012 graduated on the best in his career – fifth place in the overall World Cup with the acquis 1078 points and a loss of 247 points to the winner of the Crystal Ball – Anders Bardal. This season, Stoch was on the podium seven times – twice victorious, second twice and third three times. The classification of flights was sixth, which was also his best result. He lost 162 points to the best aviator season – Robert Kranjec, but he stood on the podium one contest flight – was third in Tauplitz.

2012/2013
On 25 January 2013, he became the joint holder of the Polish ski flying distance record (tying the mark held by Piotr Żyła) with a jump of 232.5 metres.

In the first competition in Val di Fiemme during the 2013 Ski Jumping World Championships, Stoch earned the highest score in the trial before the contest, jumping to 103 m in the first round competition, jumped a distance of 102 m and was ranked second place, losing 2.8 points to the leader – Anders Bardal. The second series reached 97 m, with a weak landing and fell to eighth place. Stoch, in post-competition interviews, stated that he is very unhappy with the obtained result – despite the relaxation made a mistake during the jump.

On 28 February 2013, achieved the title of World Champion 2013. In the first series of the competition, he showed the longest jump of 131.5 m and earned high marks for style, including the "20" from the Swiss judge. He was the leader after the first round. In the final series, like most of the top competitors, he competed with reduced at the request of the coach – the nineteenth beam. Stoch jumped 130 m, again without providing any judicial note below "19" and won the gold medal with 6.1 points more than Peter Prevc, but about 6.7 from the third Anders Jacobsen. Immediately after the competition, Stoch and Prevc were threatened with disqualification for image suits. This provision was to be introduced the day before; ultimately, the judges rejected the anonymous protest. Gold medal Stoch picked up a day later in Cavalese. He won the title of World Champion in Val di Fiemme – exactly ten years after winning the first title of World Champion by Adam Małysz. On 2 March 2013, Stoch participated in the team competition on the large hill, which was submitted to the fourth group of players. Before his first attempt, Poland was classified in fifth place. Makes a stroke on the 134-meter and, after the first round, Poland took fourth place, losing five points to the third Germans. The second started at the request of head coach Łukasz Kruczek, with a reduction of two positions beams and reached 130 meters. Polish team, including Stoch, won there a bronze medal in team competition in squad: Kamil Stoch, Dawid Kubacki, Piotr Żyła and Maciej Kot. The primary outcome of the competition his team took fourth place, but after recounting the scores because of Thomas Morgenstern, who noticed a mistake in points and at the request of the Germans, they finished in third place (Norway was in front of the Polish, but Bardal's jump was badly counted).

In the overall World Cup season, the 2012/2013 Polish representative came in third. He scored 953 points but lost 667 points to the winner of the Crystal Ball – Gregor Schlierenzauer and 46 points to the second Anders Bardal. His advantage over fourth Severin Freund totaled 30 points. He won two World Cup competitions, five times on the podium.

2013/2014
At the 2014 Winter Olympics in Sochi, Russia, Stoch entered as a medal favorite. On 9 February 2014, after qualifying easily in the first competition on the normal hill, he then landed the longest jumps in both rounds of the finals to win the title of Olympic Champion 2014. He won by 12.7 points, the fourth-largest margin of victory in a men's normal hill at the Winter Olympic Games. It was Poland's first Olympic ski jumping gold medal since Wojciech Fortuna won the large hill at the 1972 Olympics. While competing, he wore a helmet painted in military green in tribute to the Polish Air Force (with a red & white Polish Air Force checkerboard insignia on the left side of his helmet.). On 15 February 2014 – Kamil Stoch won his second gold medal, this time on the large hill, becoming the third man in history to win both hills individual events in single Olympics after Matti Nykänen in Calgary 1988 and Simon Ammann in Salt Lake City 2002, Vancouver 2010. He jumped 139 m and 132.5 m. His advantage over the second Japanese Noriaki Kasai was 1.3 points, and 3.9 points over the third Slovene Peter Prevc.

In March 2014, he won the overall FIS World Cup classification. Season 2013/2014 ended with his six victories.

2014/2015

Kamil Stoch sustained an ankle injury before the FIS World Cup opening in Klingenthal, which prevented him from participating in the first competitions of the season. He came back to training before the Four Hills Tournament. He took 10th place at Four Hills Tournament. On 18 January 2015 won FIS World Cup in Zakopane at Wielka Krokiew. It was his first victory after serious injury. On 30 January 3015, won the 15th World Cup in career, this time in Willingen. In February 2015 took part in the World Championships. He was 17th in normal hill and 12th in large hill competition. On 28 February 2015 (exactly two years after winning the World Champion title by Stoch) Polish team in squad: Stoch, Piotr Żyła, Klemens Murańka and Jan Ziobro achieved the bronze medal of World Championships 2015 in team. For Stoch is the second bronze of World Championships in the team.

On 21 March 2015, set a new Polish record of ski flying with a jump of 238 metres at Letalnica, Planica during the trial round. He took 9th place in FIS World Cup general classification. Season 2014/2015 ended with two victories, two-second place, and one third place.

2016/2017

Competing in Klingenthal on 3 December 2016, the Polish national team, composed of Żyła, Stoch, Kubacki and Kot, won their country's first-ever World Cup team event. On 11 December 2016, he achieved his 16th victory in World Cup competition ahead of the second Maciej Kot with predominantly 0.6 a point.

During the 2016–17 Four Hills Tournament, he achieved second place twice, in Oberstdorf and Garmisch-Partenkirchen. In the trial before the competition in Innsbruck, Stoch fell while landing after a long-jump. He had a very painful shoulder injury and hematoma. Despite the injury, he continued to participate in the tournament. In the windy competition in Innsbruck, he took fourth place, and the overall was second with a loss to leader Daniel Andre Tande 1.7 points. On 6 January 2017, he won the last competition in Bischofshofen and won overall (997.8 points) with a predominance over the second overall Piotr Żyła 35.3 points. Since Bischofschofen, Stoch won two individual competitions in Wisła and one in Zakopane. He has not lost since in individual competitions. In Zakopane Polish team, including Stoch and teammates – Kubacki, Kot, and Żyła, achieved second place in the team competition. On 28 January 2017 Poland won their second team competition in history in Willingen.

On 4 March 2017 Polish national team, including Żyła, Kubacki, Kot and Stoch, achieved first in history title of 2017 World Champions in the team event. They beat Norway and Austria at Salpausselkä K116 in Lahti, Finland.

2017/2018
In the 2017-18 Four Hills Tournament, Stoch became the second jumper in history – after Sven Hannawald – to win all four competitions in the Tournament, taking his second victory in a row with a total score of 1108.8 points and 69.6 points of advantage over second Andreas Wellinger.

On 20 January 2018, he achieved the silver medal of the 2018 Ski Jumping World Championships. In the three-part competition, he became the ski flying World Championships runner-up behind Daniel Andre Tande from Norway and beat German Richard Freitag in the third part. It was the second medal in history for Poland in the Ski Flying World Championships after the bronze of Piotr Fijas in 1979. The next day, Stoch and his teammates Hula, Kubacki, and Żyła, won the first ever medal, a bronze, for Poland in ski flying in team competition.

On 4 February 2018, Stoch won overall classification in the newest tournament Willingen Five 2018. He won qualifications and took 4th and 2nd place in the following competitions.

Stoch was in good shape at the beginning of the 2018 Winter Olympic Games and had good jumps at training sessions and qualifications. At the normal hill event, he took 4th place. On 17 February 2018, he won a gold medal ahead of Andreas Wellinger and Robert Johansson at large hill. It was his third title of the Olympic Champion. On 19 February 2018 Stoch and his teammates Maciej Kot, Stefan Hula and Dawid Kubacki achieved first medal in Olympic team competition for Poland. They claimed bronze behind Norway and Germany.

Olympic Games

Kamil Stoch started at Olympic Games four times – in Turin 2006, Vancouver 2010, Sochi 2014 and PyeongChang 2018. In the first one, he was 16th on normal hill K95 and 26th place on large hill K125. In the team competition, he was with the Polish team in 5th place. In Vancouver, he was 27th on normal hill (weaker than in Turin) and 14th on large hill. In the team competition, in which he also jumped, Poland was ranked 6th.

In Sochi, Russia, in the individual competition on the normal hill, he won the title of Olympic Champion. At the same Olympics, Kamil Stoch also won the Olympic title in the individual competition on the large hill K125. He is the third man in history to win both hills individual events in single Olympics after Matti Nykänen in Calgary 1988 and Simon Ammann in Salt Lake City 2002, Vancouver 2010.

On 21 January 2018, coach Horngacher officially appointed Kamil Stoch to 2018 Winter Olympics. Stoch took 4th place at normal hill event and 1st (earning him a gold medal) at the large hill event. It was his third title of Olympic Champion. Two days later, he added the fourth Olympic medal to his collection, a bronze with the Polish team (Poland's first-ever Olympic medal team).

World Championships
Kamil Stoch took part in FIS Nordic World Ski Championships eight times. He debuted in Oberstdorf, where he finished in 37th place on the large hill. Later he appeared in Sapporo, Liberec and Oslo. In 2013 he became a World Champion in Val di Fiemme. On 24 February 2017, he established a new hill record (103.5 m) at Salpausselkä HS97 in qualifications before the first competition of 2017 World Championships.

Ski Flying World Championships
Stoch became the runner-up of the 2018 Ski Flying World Championships in Oberstdorf. It was the second medal in ski flying for Poland after 39 years. Also, the next day he achieved, with the Polish team, a first medal in ski flying in team for Poland.

World Cup

Season standings

Individual starts

Victories

Podiums

Team victories

State awards
 2014  Knight's Cross of Polonia Restituta
 2017  Honorary Badge of Lesser Poland Voivodeship – Cross of Małopolska

Other awards
 2014, 2017 Polish Sportspersonality of the Year
 2015 Holmenkollen Medal

See also
 Sport in Poland
 Poland at the Winter Olympics
 List of Poles

References

External links

1987 births
Living people
Sportspeople from Zakopane
Polish male ski jumpers
Olympic ski jumpers of Poland
Ski jumpers at the 2006 Winter Olympics
Ski jumpers at the 2010 Winter Olympics
Ski jumpers at the 2014 Winter Olympics
Ski jumpers at the 2018 Winter Olympics
Ski jumpers at the 2022 Winter Olympics
Medalists at the 2014 Winter Olympics
Medalists at the 2018 Winter Olympics
Olympic gold medalists for Poland
Olympic bronze medalists for Poland
Olympic medalists in ski jumping
FIS Nordic World Ski Championships medalists in ski jumping
Holmenkollen medalists
21st-century Polish people